Epithelial membrane protein 1 is a protein that in humans is encoded by the EMP1 gene.

References

Further reading

Biomarkers